The 1986 Stockholm Open was a men's tennis tournament played on hard courts and part of the 1986 Nabisco Grand Prix and took place at the Kungliga tennishallen in Stockholm, Sweden. It was the 18th edition of the tournament and was held from 3 November until 9 November 1986. First-seeded Stefan Edberg won the singles title.

Finals

Singles

 Stefan Edberg defeated  Mats Wilander, 6–2, 6–1, 6–1
 It was Edberg's 3rd singles title of the year and the 8th of his career.

Doubles

 Sherwood Stewart /  Kim Warwick defeated  Pat Cash /  Slobodan Živojinović, 6–4, 6–4

References

External links
 
 Association of Tennis Professionals (ATP) tournament profile
 1986 Stockholm Open at SVT's open archive 

Stockholm Open
Stockholm Open
Stockholm Open
Stockholm Open
1980s in Stockholm